Panagoda is a town in Western Province, Sri Lanka of Sri Lanka. It is 20 km away from Colombo.  Situated there is the Panagoda Cantonment, the largest military base in the country.

See also
Panagoda Cantonment

Populated places in Colombo District
Towns in Western Province, Sri Lanka